Universal Everything is a digital art practice and design studio based in Sheffield, England. The studio was founded in 2004 by Matt Pyke, who is the creative director. Pyke studied botanical and technical illustration and then graphic design, before spending eight years at the Designers Republic (1996–2004).

Universal Everything have worked with several well known brands and corporations including Chanel, AOL Intel, Nike Inc., Hyundai, Samsung and Zaha Hadid, Apple, and Deutsche Bank and created the moving image identity for the London Olympic Games 2012

In April 2011, the studio created Super-Computer-Romantics, their first major solo exhibition, for the launch of the new digital art museum La Gaîté Lyrique in Paris.

In February 2014, Universal Everything released Polyfauna, an interactive music app developed in collaboration with Radiohead and the artist Stanley Donwood.

A monograph about the studio's work will be published in 2019 by Unit Editions.

Style
The studio utilises modern technologies such as 3D printing, touch screens, motion capture, large format video displays and complex sound design to create large scale experiential works. Its work often incorporates and references architecture, modernism, synesthesia, landscapes, anthropomorphism, human movement, and figurative forms.

Notable works
 Presence, an innovative motion capture work, in collaboration with Benjamin Millepied and The LA Dance Project
 Mobius Loop, a series of 18 large scale video artworks commissioned by Hyundai for their Vision Hall in Mabuk, South Korea, which received a Red Dot Communication Design award
 Evolving Environments, commissioned by Deutsche Bank for their headquarters in Hong Kong
 Walking City, awarded the 2014 PRIX Ars Electronica Golden Nica for Computer Animation/VFX
 Communion, a 360 audio-visual installation
MTV Worldwide, global brand identity for relaunch of 62 channels
 Transfiguration, an evolving animation
Screens of the Future, a video series that imagines prototypes for future display technology
Unconfined, an immersive installation to launch the Samsung Galaxy S8 at Milan Design Week
Hype Cycle, a series of futurist films exploring human-machine collaboration
Inside the Sound, a series of 360° audiovisual environments
Tribes, a study of human behaviour on a mass scale
Emergence, a VR experience
The Vehicle of Nature, an installation inspired by Leonardo Da Vinci's studies of flowing water

Artworks
Universal Everything's artworks have been shown globally as part of group shows and solo exhibitions, including at Museum of Modern Art (New York), V&A Museum (London), Central Academy of Fine Arts (Beijing), Garage Centre for Contemporary Culture  (Moscow), La Gaîté Lyrique (Paris), Vitra Design Museum (Germany), MAAT (Lisbon), Borusan Contemporary (Istanbul), and as part of Digital Revolution the internationally touring exhibition curated by the Barbican.

Artworks by Universal Everything have been held in the collections at Borusan Contemporary since 2014.

Universal Everything regularly publishes exclusive artworks on the digital platform Sedition.

In June 2014, Universal Everything's work, Walking City, was awarded the PRIX Ars Electronica "Golden Nica for Computer Animation/VFX".

In 2019, the studio's VR artwork Emergence premiered at Sundance Film Festival.

References

External links

Companies based in Sheffield
British companies established in 2004
Graphic design studios